Astictopterus bruno is a species of butterfly in the family Hesperiidae. It is found in Tanzania (south-west to the Marungu highlands and the Lindi River).

References

Endemic fauna of Tanzania
Butterflies described in 1937
Astictopterini